The 2nd constituency of Aveyron is one of three French National Assembly constituencies in the Aveyron département.

Deputies

Election results

2022

 
 
 
 
 
 
 
 
|-
| colspan="8" bgcolor="#E9E9E9"|
|-

2017
André At, the Republicans candidate withdrew from the election before the 2nd round.

2012

|- style="background-color:#E9E9E9;text-align:center;"
! colspan="2" rowspan="2" style="text-align:left;" | Candidate
! rowspan="2" colspan="2" style="text-align:left;" | Party
! colspan="2" | 1st round
! colspan="2" | 2nd round
|- style="background-color:#E9E9E9;text-align:center;"
! width="75" | Votes
! width="30" | %
! width="75" | Votes
! width="30" | %
|-
| style="background-color:" |
| style="text-align:left;" | Marie-Lou Marcel
| style="text-align:left;" | Socialist Party
| PS
| 
| 49.65%
| 
| 63.49%
|-
| style="background-color:" |
| style="text-align:left;" | Laurent Tranier
| style="text-align:left;" | Union for a Popular Movement
| UMP
| 
| 27.47%
| 
| 36.51%
|-
| style="background-color:" |
| style="text-align:left;" | Philippe Bramm
| style="text-align:left;" | National Front
| FN
| 
| 7.70%
| colspan="2" style="text-align:left;" |
|-
| style="background-color:" |
| style="text-align:left;" | Aline Louangvannasy
| style="text-align:left;" | Left Front
| FG
| 
| 6.43%
| colspan="2" style="text-align:left;" |
|-
| style="background-color:" |
| style="text-align:left;" | Jean-Louis Calmettes
| style="text-align:left;" | The Greens
| VEC
| 
| 3.68%
| colspan="2" style="text-align:left;" |
|-
| style="background-color:" |
| style="text-align:left;" | Christophe Pourcel
| style="text-align:left;" | Radical Party
| PRV
| 
| 3.66%
| colspan="2" style="text-align:left;" |
|-
| style="background-color:" |
| style="text-align:left;" | Yann Puech
| style="text-align:left;" | Far Left
| EXG
| 
| 0.95%
| colspan="2" style="text-align:left;" |
|-
| style="background-color:" |
| style="text-align:left;" | Philippe Molinie
| style="text-align:left;" | Far Left
| EXG
| 
| 0.47%
| colspan="2" style="text-align:left;" |
|-
| colspan="8" style="background-color:#E9E9E9;"|
|- style="font-weight:bold"
| colspan="4" style="text-align:left;" | Total
| 
| 100%
| 
| 100%
|-
| colspan="8" style="background-color:#E9E9E9;"|
|-
| colspan="4" style="text-align:left;" | Registered voters
| 
| style="background-color:#E9E9E9;"|
| 
| style="background-color:#E9E9E9;"|
|-
| colspan="4" style="text-align:left;" | Blank/Void ballots
| 
| 2.21%
| 
| 3.16%
|-
| colspan="4" style="text-align:left;" | Turnout
| 
| 65.48%
| 
| 63.31%
|-
| colspan="4" style="text-align:left;" | Abstentions
| 
| 34.52%
| 
| 36.69%
|-
| colspan="8" style="background-color:#E9E9E9;"|
|- style="font-weight:bold"
| colspan="6" style="text-align:left;" | Result
| colspan="2" style="background-color:" | PS HOLD
|}

2007

|- style="background-color:#E9E9E9;text-align:center;"
! colspan="2" rowspan="2" style="text-align:left;" | Candidate
! rowspan="2" colspan="2" style="text-align:left;" | Party
! colspan="2" | 1st round
! colspan="2" | 2nd round
|- style="background-color:#E9E9E9;text-align:center;"
! width="75" | Votes
! width="30" | %
! width="75" | Votes
! width="30" | %
|-
| style="background-color:" |
| style="text-align:left;" | Marie-Lou Marcel
| style="text-align:left;" | Socialist Party
| PS
| 
| 21.57%
| 
| 50.61%
|-
| style="background-color:" |
| style="text-align:left;" | Serge Roques
| style="text-align:left;" | Union for a Popular Movement
| UMP
| 
| 40.52%
| 
| 49.39%
|-
| style="background-color:" |
| style="text-align:left;" | Sophie Renac
| style="text-align:left;" | Radical Party of the Left
| PRG
| 
| 10.29%
| colspan="2" style="text-align:left;" |
|-
| style="background-color:" |
| style="text-align:left;" | Jean-Louis Cance
| style="text-align:left;" | Democratic Movement
| MoDem
| 
| 8.47%
| colspan="2" style="text-align:left;" |
|-
| style="background-color:" |
| style="text-align:left;" | Jean-Pierre Pouzoulet
| style="text-align:left;" | Miscellaneous Left
| DVG
| 
| 5.86%
| colspan="2" style="text-align:left;" |
|-
| style="background-color:" |
| style="text-align:left;" | Jean-Luc Vernhes
| style="text-align:left;" | Far Left
| EXG
| 
| 3.29%
| colspan="2" style="text-align:left;" |
|-
| style="background-color:" |
| style="text-align:left;" | Daniel Gruszka
| style="text-align:left;" | Communist
| COM
| 
| 2.99%
| colspan="2" style="text-align:left;" |
|-
| style="background-color:" |
| style="text-align:left;" | Suzanne Ratel-Sattler
| style="text-align:left;" | National Front
| FN
| 
| 1.96%
| colspan="2" style="text-align:left;" |
|-
| style="background-color:" |
| style="text-align:left;" | Carine Aubril
| style="text-align:left;" | Ecologist
| ECO
| 
| 1.45%
| colspan="2" style="text-align:left;" |
|-
| style="background-color:" |
| style="text-align:left;" | Jean-Yves Calmettes
| style="text-align:left;" | Hunting, Fishing, Nature, Traditions
| CPNT
| 
| 1.35%
| colspan="2" style="text-align:left;" |
|-
| style="background-color:" |
| style="text-align:left;" | Monique Frayssinet
| style="text-align:left;" | Regionalist
| REG
| 
| 0.92%
| colspan="2" style="text-align:left;" |
|-
| style="background-color:" |
| style="text-align:left;" | Jacques Antonin
| style="text-align:left;" | Divers
| DIV
| 
| 0.74%
| colspan="2" style="text-align:left;" |
|-
| style="background-color:" |
| style="text-align:left;" | Marie Humbert
| style="text-align:left;" | Far Left
| EXG
| 
| %
| colspan="2" style="text-align:left;" |
|-
| style="background-color:" |
| style="text-align:left;" | Edouard Demarets
| style="text-align:left;" | Far Right
| EXD
| 
| 0.00%
| colspan="2" style="text-align:left;" |
|-
| colspan="8" style="background-color:#E9E9E9;"|
|- style="font-weight:bold"
| colspan="4" style="text-align:left;" | Total
| 
| 100%
| 
| 100%
|-
| colspan="8" style="background-color:#E9E9E9;"|
|-
| colspan="4" style="text-align:left;" | Registered voters
| 
| style="background-color:#E9E9E9;"|
| 
| style="background-color:#E9E9E9;"|
|-
| colspan="4" style="text-align:left;" | Blank/Void ballots
| 
| 2.73%
| 
| 3.83%
|-
| colspan="4" style="text-align:left;" | Turnout
| 
| 67.35%
| 
| 69.16%
|-
| colspan="4" style="text-align:left;" | Abstentions
| 
| 32.65%
| 
| 30.84%
|-
| colspan="8" style="background-color:#E9E9E9;"|
|- style="font-weight:bold"
| colspan="6" style="text-align:left;" | Result
| colspan="2" style="background-color:" | PS GAIN
|}

2002

 
 
 
 
 
 
 
 
|-
| colspan="8" bgcolor="#E9E9E9"|
|-

1997

References

Sources
 Official results of French elections from 1998: 

2